Kyaw Thet (1921–2008) was a historian of Burma, and professor of Burmese and Eastern History Studies at the University of Rangoon. He is of Burman and Mon descent. Kyaw Thet received his bachelor's degree at the University of Rangoon, and master's and doctorate degrees at the University of London. He was also a visiting professor at Yale University.

References

Bibliography

External links

Academic staff of the University of Yangon
20th-century Burmese historians
2008 deaths
University of Yangon alumni
1921 births
Yale University alumni
Alumni of the University of London
Burmese people of Mon descent
Burmese expatriates in the United Kingdom
Burmese expatriates in the United States